Calyptellopsis is a genus of fungi within the Hyaloscyphaceae family. This is a monotypic genus, containing the single species Calyptellopsis reticulata.

References

External links
Calyptellopsis at Index Fungorum

Hyaloscyphaceae
Monotypic Leotiomycetes genera